Mian County or Mianxian is a county of Hanzhong, in the southwest of Shaanxi province, China, bordering Gansu province to the northwest. Its area measures , and its total population as of 2020 was 429,000 people. During the Qin and Han dynasty it was known as Mianshui (沔水). In 1964 it was renamed to Mianxian with a homophone character for Mian, to avoid the use of uncommon characters in place names. In 2020, the county government requested the name of the county to be changed to Mianzhou (沔州市), pending central government approval. Previously the government requested to use the name Dingjunshan City, but this was denied by the central government.

The tomb of Zhuge Liang near Mount Dingjun is located in the county.

Transportation
Mian County is served by the Yangpingguan–Ankang Railway.

Administrative divisions 
Mian County has 19 subordinate towns:

Climate

References

County-level divisions of Shaanxi
Hanzhong